The women's cross country competition at the 2018 Asian Games was held on 21 August 2018 at the Khe Bun Hill in Subang Regency.

Schedule
All times are Western Indonesia Time (UTC+07:00)

Results 
Legend
DNF — Did not finish

References
Results

External links
Official website

Mountain Women